Talk That Talk is a 2011 album by Rihanna.

Talk That Talk may also refer to:

 Talk That Talk (The Jazz Crusaders album) (1966)
 Talk That Talk (Johnny "Hammond" Smith album) (1960)
 "Talk That Talk" (Jackie Wilson song) (1959)
 "Talk That Talk" (Rihanna song) (2012)
 "Talk That Talk" (Twice song) (2022)

See also 
 Walk That Walk, Talk That Talk, a 1991 album by the Fabulous Thunderbirds
 You Talk That Talk!, a 1971 album by Gene Ammons and Sonny Stitt